Millenia Tower is a , 41-storey skyscraper at Marina Centre in Singapore next to Promenade MRT station. The building is located in Millenia Singapore, and is the centrepiece of the development, less than 20 minutes from Singapore Changi Airport.

Arts and architecture
It is designed by Pritzker Prize laureate Kevin Roche. The square footprint rests on four illuminated cylinders which in turn frames a striking glass lobby. The tower is crowned with a massive pyramidal roof which is the tallest focal point of the entire development.

At the five storey tall lobby is a spectacular mural entitled “Rising” by acclaimed artist Frank Stella. Millenia Tower also houses the giant pumpkin sculpture by Yayoi Kusama, one of the world's most influential artists.

Services and amenities 
 In-house property management with security, housekeeping, technicians, etc.
 Millenia Concierge by Conrad Centennial Singapore, offers hotel concierge service to office tenants.

See also
 List of tallest buildings in Singapore

References

External links

 Millenia Tower at Pontiac Land Private Limited

Downtown Core (Singapore)
John Burgee buildings
Office buildings completed in 1996
Skyscraper office buildings in Singapore
Marina Centre
20th-century architecture in Singapore